Chukwu is the supreme being of Igbo spirituality. In the Igbo pantheon, Chukwu is the source of all other Igbo deities and is responsible for assigning them their different tasks. The Igbo people believe that all things come from Chukwu, who brings the rain necessary for plants to grow and controls everything on Earth and the spiritual world. They believe Chukwu to be an undefinable omnipotent and omnipresent supreme deity that encompasses everything in space and space itself.

Linguistic studies suggest that the name "Chukwu" is a portmanteau of the Igbo words "chi" ("spiritual being") and "ukwu" ("great in size").

Conception of Chukwu
According to the Igbo people, who are the majority in the southeastern region of Nigeria today, Chineke is the creator of the universe and everything good in it along with rain, trees, and other plants. Chukwu is a supreme deity represented by the sun. The ancient deity is not humanized in Igbo tradition belief.

Many Igbo Christians refer to the Christian God as Chukwu. Chukwu (Chu-kwu) is similar to "The Most High" and "The Almighty" instead of a name like "God" which is of Germanic origin, usually referring to an idol in the pre-Christian era. The Igbo believe it is impossible for humans to conceive of the unlimited greatness of Chukwu. Many Igbo dialects refer to The Almighty by titles such as "Chukwu" (Chi Ukwu), "Chineke" (Chi Na Eke), "Chukwu Okike" (Chi Ukwu Okike), "Chiokike" (Chi Okike), "Chuku" (Chi Uku), "Ebili Ukpabi" (Ebili nu Ukpabi), and "Obasi" (Obi Alusi).

There are six aspects of Chukwu:
 Chukwu – the first force and existence of all beings.
 Anyanwu – the symbolic meaning of the sun. The sun reveals everything so Chukwu is the source of knowledge and the author of all knowledge.
 Ala – the fertility of Earth, its people, and its spiritual world full of sub-deities.
 Amadioha – the bringer of justice, love, peace, and unity, and the creator of humankind.
 Chi – a sub-deity functioning as a personal, spiritual guide.
 Okike – creator of laws that govern the visible and invisible.

See also
 Chukwu (surname)
 Ibo loa
 Igbo culture

References

Igbo deities
Creator deities
Names of God in African traditional religions